The Puteaux SA 18 was a French single-shot, breech-loading cannon, used in World War I through World War II, primarily mounted on combat vehicles. It is closely related to the Canon d'Infanterie de 37 modèle 1916 TRP, also produced by Puteaux. 

It was a simple, reliable weapon with a high rate of fire made possible by a semi-automatic breech system. It was primarily intended to be used against infantry and machine-gun nests because its low muzzle velocity made it unsuitable for anti-armour use. Although its armour penetration capabilities were poor, it was able to combat light armoured vehicles as late as 1939.  The gun was operated by one soldier and was found easy to use, with a low incidence of jamming. It was sighted on target with a separate scope attached to the left side of the weapon.

Technical details

The barrel length was 21 calibres (L/21). While its maximum fire rate was 15 rounds per minute, its practical rate was only 10 rounds. After firing, the breech opened and ejected the used cartridge case automatically. The weapon was served only by the gunner who aimed it through a simple 1x direct sight.

This gun was standard on French light tanks and armoured cars, being mounted on the Renault FT and White AM armoured car in World War I.  In World War II, it was used on the Renault R-35, Hotchkiss H-35 and H-38, FCM-36 and several types of French armoured cars, mainly the White-Laffly AMD 50.

In the Polish Army of the 1920s through World War II the wz.18 Puteaux gun was used on Renault FT light tanks and Renault R-35 and Hotchkiss H-35, Peugeot armoured cars, and the Samochód pancerny wz. 28, Samochód pancerny wz. 29 and Samochód pancerny wz. 34 armoured cars. It was also used on some Polish riverine craft and armoured trains.

References

External links

Tank guns of France
World War I artillery of France
World War II weapons of France
37 mm artillery